Kogi United is a Nigerian football club that play in the second-tier division in Nigerian football, the Nigeria National League. 25,000 capacity Lokoja Confluence Stadium is the stadium used by Kogi United. They have Hummel as their kits sponsor.

They were banned from the Nigeria Federation Cup for 2 seasons after crowd encroachment in a 2017 First Round game against Enugu Rangers; their first-ever home game in the cup.

Current squad

References

Football clubs in Nigeria
Sports clubs in Nigeria